In Greek mythology, Syrus or Syros (Ancient Greek: Σύρων) may refer to a person or an animal:

 Syrus, son of Sinope (daughter of Asopus and Metope) and Apollo; the Syrians are named after him. In one account, Syros was the son of King Agenor of Tyre and Tyro, and brother to Cadmus, Phoenix, Cilix and Europa. When Agenor was about to die, he decreed that his kingdom will be divided among his three sons: Phoenix, Syros and Cilix. Syros named the country which was allotted to him Syria while his brothers received Phoenicia and Cilicia, respectively. Syros was said to be a wise man who wrote arithmetic philosophy in Phoenician letters.
 Syrus, one of the dogs of the hunter Actaeon.

Note

References 

 Diodorus Siculus, The Library of History translated by Charles Henry Oldfather. Twelve volumes. Loeb Classical Library. Cambridge, Massachusetts: Harvard University Press; London: William Heinemann, Ltd. 1989. Vol. 3. Books 4.59–8. Online version at Bill Thayer's Web Site
 Diodorus Siculus, Bibliotheca Historica. Vol 1-2. Immanel Bekker. Ludwig Dindorf. Friedrich Vogel. in aedibus B. G. Teubneri. Leipzig. 1888-1890. Greek text available at the Perseus Digital Library.
Gaius Julius Hyginus, Fabulae from The Myths of Hyginus translated and edited by Mary Grant. University of Kansas Publications in Humanistic Studies. Online version at the Topos Text Project.

Children of Apollo